The Lace is the only solo studio album by American rock and roll singer Benjamin Orr, best known for his work with The Cars. It was released on October 6, 1986, by Elektra Records and features his only solo hit, the song, "Stay the Night", which reached the top 40 in 1987. A follow-up single "Too Hot to Stop" was also released but failed to chart. Wounded Bird Records re-released the album on CD on August 15, 2006.

Track listing

Personnel 
Credits adapted from AllMusic.
Benjamin Orr – lead and backing vocals, bass, keyboards, drum programming, production
Diane Grey Page – backing vocals
Michael Landau - guitars
Elliot Easton – guitars
Larry Klein – keyboards, production

Technical personnel

 Mike Shipley - production, engineering and recording
 Thom Moore - additional engineering and mixing (except "Stay The Night" and "Too Hot To Stop")
 Mike Shipley - mixing on "Stay The Night" and "Too Hot To Stop"
 Bob Ludwig - mastering at Master disk
 All songs published by Orange Village Music (ASCAP)

Charts

References

1986 debut albums
Albums produced by Larry Klein
Albums produced by Mike Shipley
Benjamin Orr albums
Elektra Records albums